Cinderhill is an area in the City of Nottingham.

Cinderhill lies within two city wards; the northern part of Cinderhill lies within the Basford ward, which includes the Phoenix Park branch as well as many facilities. The southern part lies within the Aspley ward, which mainly consists of council housing that was constructed in the 1930s, and is widely known by the locals as the Bell's Lane Estate. According to the 2001 Census, the estate had a population of 2,959.

Facilities
Many of Cinderhill's facilities are located on Nuthall Road. Facilities include a gym, an Iceland store, as well as a KFC and a Tesco Express store with a petrol station included.

Other facilities include the Rosslyn Park Primary and Nursery School located off Amesbury Circus, a One Stop convenience store, a Fish Bar and a take away located off Bell's Lane, and the Double Tree by Hilton Hotel off Nuthall and Cinderhill Road.

Demographics
According to the 2001 Census, the estate had a population of 2,959, and a majority of the population are aged 25–44, who make up 29.9% of the estate's population.

The census also shows that 88.4% of the population is White British, as well as 0.9% being White Irish and 1.7% being classed as Other White. 3.0% of the population is Mixed Race, 2.5% is Asian or Asian British and 2.8% is Black or Black British. 0.3% of the population is Chinese and other ethnic groups make up 0.2% of the estate's population.

Religion
The 2001 Census shows that 54.3% of the population are Christian and Atheists make up 30.8% of the estate's population. 2.2% of the population are Muslim, 0.5% are Hindu and 0.2% are Sikh. Buddhism and Judaism each score 0.1%, other religions make up 0.5% of the estate's population and 11.3% of the population did not state their religion.

Industry
Between 1841 and 1986, Cinderhill was the location of Babbington Colliery.

Transport

Tram
The Cinderhill tram stop has a single platform as well as a single track, and has frequent services from Phoenix Park to Clifton South as part of NET's Line 2 service.

Nottingham Express Transit
 2: Clifton South → Clifton → Wilford Lane → Railway Station → Nottingham → The Forest → Wilkinson Street → Highbury Vale → Cinderhill → Phoenix Park

Bus services
Nottingham City Transport
 35: Nottingham → Derby Road → QMC → University Park → Wollaton Vale → Bilborough → Strelley → Cinderhill → Bulwell

 70: Nottingham → Sherwood Rise → Basford → Cinderhill (Bagnall Road) → Bulwell → Bulwell Morrisons

 70B: Nottingham → Sherwood Rise → Basford → Cinderhill (Bagnall Road) → Bulwell

 71: Nottingham → Sherwood Rise → Basford → Cinderhill → Bulwell → Bulwell Morrisons

 71B: Nottingham → Sherwood Rise → Basford → Cinderhill → Bulwell

 77C: Nottingham → Alfreton Road → Aspley Lane → Strelley → Cinderhill

 79: Nottingham → Alfreton Road → Nuthall Road → Cinderhill → Bulwell → Rise Park → Warren Hill → Bestwood Park → Arnold

 79A: Nottingham → Alfreton Road → Nuthall Road → Cinderhill → Bulwell → Rise Park → Top Valley → Bestwood Park → Arnold

 79B: Nottingham → Alfreton Road → Nuthall Road → Cinderhill → Bulwell / Rise Park

 A1: Nottingham → Alfreton Road → Aspley Lane → Strelley → Cinderhill → Whitemoor

 N77: Nottingham → Alfreton Road → Aspley Lane → Strelley → Cinderhill → Whitemoor

Trentbarton
 rainbow one: Nottingham → Cinderhill → Nuthall → Kimberley → Eastwood → Heanor / Ripley / Alfreton

Nottingham Community Transport
 L4: Nottingham → Radford → Ainsley Estate → Beechdale → Aspley → Cinderhill

Silverdale Tours
 S34: Ainsley Estate → Beechdale → Strelley → Broxtowe → Aspley → Cinderhill → Bulwell

References

Areas of Nottingham